The Ministry of Foreign Affairs of Peru is the government ministry in charge of foreign policy and international relations and international cooperation. It works in coordination with Peruvian ambassadors and consuls with accrediting in different countries and with international organizations. In the same way, it coordinates, attends to and treats with accrediting embassies before the Peruvian State in Lima, with foreign consulates accrediting in different cities of the country and with international organizations that have seat or representatives in Lima. , the minister is Ana Cecilia Gervasi.

Ministers

Minister of Government and Foreign Relations

Minister of Foreign Relations, Justice and Ecclesiastical Affairs

Minister of Government and Foreign Relations

External links 
 Official Website 

Peru
Foreign
Foreign relations of Peru